Fatepur Union is a union parishad situated at Maheshpur Upazila,  in Jhenaidah District, Khulna Division of Bangladesh. There are 13 villages and 8 mouzas in the union.

References

External links
 

Unions of Khulna Division
Unions of Maheshpur Upazila
Unions of Jhenaidah District